The president of the Federated States of Micronesia is the head of state and government of the Federated States of Micronesia (FSM). The FSM president, by virtue of his or her office, is the head of the FSM Cabinet and is in charge of the administration and operations of the National Government. The president is assisted by the vice-president, both of whom are elected by the FSM Congress from among the at-large members to serve for four-year terms. The current and ninth president of the FSM is David Panuelo, who replaced Peter Christian on 11 May 2019.

Qualifications
According to Article 10 of the FSM Constitution, people who fulfil the following requirements are eligible to serve as president.

 Must be a Senator at-Large in the FSM Congress serving for four-year terms.
 Must be a citizen of the FSM by birth.
 Must be a resident of the FSM for at least 15 years.

Roles

Constitutional roles
 To execute and implement the provisions of the FSM National Constitution and national laws.
 To receive foreign ambassadors and to conduct foreign affairs and national defense.
 To grant pardons and reprieves.
 To appoint ambassadors.
 To appoint justices for the FSM Supreme Court and other courts prescribed by statute.
 To appoint heads of the executive departments (FSM Cabinet).

Insignia

Office
The Office of the President of the Federated States of Micronesia is located in the national capital of Palikir in Pohnpei State.

List of presidents
The history of the office holders is as follows:

See also
Vice President of the Federated States of Micronesia
High Commissioner of the Trust Territory of the Pacific Islands

References

External links
President of the FSM (official site)

 
1979 establishments in the Trust Territory of the Pacific Islands
Presidents